This is a list of 951 species in Lixus, a genus of true weevils in the family Curculionidae.

Lixus species

 Lixus abdominalis Boheman, 1835 c
 Lixus aberratus Boheman, 1835 c
 Lixus achyranthis Marshall, 1930 c
 Lixus acicularis Germar, 1824 c
 Lixus aciculatirostris Boheman, 1843 c
 Lixus acirostris Chittenden, 1930 c
 Lixus acuminatus Boheman, 1835 c
 Lixus acupictus Villa & Villa, 1833 c
 Lixus acutus Boheman, 1843 c
 Lixus adspersus Boheman, 1836 c
 Lixus aemulus Petri, 1928 c
 Lixus aeneus Cristofori & Jan, 1832 c
 Lixus aenigma Kolbe, 1898 c
 Lixus aequatorialis Petri, 1928 c
 Lixus aeruginosus Capiomont, 1874 c
 Lixus aethiopiae Csiki, 1934 c
 Lixus aethiopicus Petri, 1912 c
 Lixus aethiops Schoenherr, 1835 c
 Lixus affinis Boheman, 1843 c
 Lixus akonis Kono, 1929 c
 Lixus albicornis Fairmaire, 1904 c
 Lixus albidus Latreille, 1804 c
 Lixus albinae Formánek, 1925 c
 Lixus albisetiger Chittenden, 1930 c
 Lixus albocinctus Fåhraeus, 1871 c
 Lixus alboguttatus Wiedemann, C.R.W., 1821 c
 Lixus albolineatus Lea, 1898 c
 Lixus albomaculatus Pic, 1923 c
 Lixus albomarginatus Boheman, 1843 c g
 Lixus albopictus Reitter, 1892 c
 Lixus albostriatus Fabricius, J.C., 1801 c
 Lixus albovittatus Pic, 1919 c
 Lixus algiroides Voss, 1962 c
 Lixus algirus Capiomont, 1874 c
 Lixus alpinus Hustache, 1929 c
 Lixus ambositrensis Hustache, 1920 c
 Lixus amitinus Kolbe, 1898 c
 Lixus amoenus Faust, 1888 c
 Lixus amphora Fabricius, J.C., 1801 c
 Lixus amplexus Casey, 1891 i c
 Lixus amplirostris Petri, 1904 c
 Lixus amurensis Faust, 1887 c
 Lixus anguiculus Boheman, 1836 c
 Lixus anguinus (Linnaeus, C., 1767) c g
 Lixus angulicollis Faust, 1889 c
 Lixus angustatus Dahl, c
 Lixus angusticollis Boheman, 1836 c
 Lixus angustus (Herbst, 1795) c g
 Lixus antennatus Motschulsky, 1853 c
 Lixus anthracinus Faust, 1889 c
 Lixus anthrax Petri, 1928 c
 Lixus antilope Fabricius, J.C., 1801 c
 Lixus antiodontalgicus Illiger, c
 Lixus apfelbecki Petri, 1904 c
 Lixus appendiculatus Boheman, 1843 c
 Lixus apterus Champion, 1902 c
 Lixus arabs Olivier, 1807 c
 Lixus araticollis Marshall, 1940 c
 Lixus arcurostris Petri, 1912 c
 Lixus arnoldiorum Ter-Minasian, 1966 c
 Lixus arundinis Thunberg, 1815 c
 Lixus ascanii (Linnaeus, C., 1767) c g
 Lixus ascanioides Villa & Villa in Catteneo, 1844 c
 Lixus ascanoides Villa & Villa, 1833 c
 Lixus asiaticus Petri, 1904 c
 Lixus asper LeConte, 1876 i c b
 Lixus aspericollis Chittenden, 1930 i c
 Lixus assiniensis Hustache, 1932 c
 Lixus astrachanicus Faust, 1883 c
 Lixus atriplicis Fabricius, J.C., 1801 c
 Lixus attenuatus Ahrens, 1812 c
 Lixus atticus Desbrochers, 1893 c
 Lixus auctus LeConte, 1857 c
 Lixus augurius Boheman, 1835 c
 Lixus auricillatus Boheman, 1843 c
 Lixus auriculatus Sahlberg, 1823 c
 Lixus auritus Boheman, 1836 c
 Lixus aurivillii Csiki, 1934 c
 Lixus australis Boisduval, 1835 c
 Lixus avuncularius Kolbe, 1898 c
 Lixus babaulti Hustache, 1936 c
 Lixus baculiformis Petri, 1904 c
 Lixus baculus Gerstaecker, 1871 c
 †Lixus balazuci Voisin & Nel, 1993 c
 Lixus balcanicus Petri, 1904 c
 Lixus bambalio Germar, 1824 c
 Lixus barbarus Olivier, 1807 c
 Lixus barbiger Dohrn, 1884 c
 Lixus barbirostris Fabricius, J.C., 1801 c
 Lixus bardanae (Fabricius, J.C., 1787) c g
 Lixus basilaris Boheman, 1843 c
 Lixus beauprei Pic, 1905 c
 Lixus biangulifer Marshall, 1936 c
 Lixus bicolor Olivier, 1807 c
 Lixus bicostalis Petri, 1912 c
 Lixus bidens Capiomont, 1874 c
 Lixus bidentatus Donovan, 1805 c
 Lixus bifasciatus Petri, 1904 c
 Lixus bifossatus Kolbe, 1898 c
 Lixus bifoveatus Chevrolat, 1881 c
 Lixus biimpressus Gyllenhal, 1836 c
 Lixus bilineatus Olivier, 1807 c
 Lixus bimbiensis Hustache, 1936 c
 Lixus binodulus Boheman, 1836 c
 Lixus binotatus Boheman, 1835 c
 Lixus biplicatus Chevrolat, 1881 c
 Lixus bisarmatus Petri, 1928 c
 Lixus bischoffi Fall, 1922 c
 Lixus bisinuatus Petri, 1928 c
 Lixus biskrensis Capiomont, 1874 c
 Lixus bisulcatus Faust, 1896 c
 Lixus bituberculatus Smreczynski, 1968 g
 Lixus bituberosus Fairmaire, 1904 c
 Lixus bivirgatus Desbrochers, 1898 c
 Lixus blakeae Chittenden, 1928 c
 Lixus blatchleyi Csiki, 1934 c
 Lixus blondina  c
 Lixus boehmi Hartmann, 1909 c
 Lixus bolivianus Petri, 1928 c
 Lixus bonguensis Hartmann, 1900 c
 Lixus borneanus Petri, 1914 c
 Lixus brachyrhinus Boheman, 1843 c
 Lixus brachyrrhinus Boheman, 1843 c
 Lixus brachysomus Petri, 1928 c
 Lixus brasilianus Petri, 1928 c
 Lixus brasiliensis Dejean, 1821 c
 Lixus breviatus Desbrochers, 1891 c
 Lixus brevicaudatus Petri, 1912 c
 Lixus brevicaudis Kuester, 1849 c
 Lixus breviculus Champion, 1910 c
 Lixus brevipennis Ruter, 1939 c
 Lixus brevipes Brisout, 1866 c
 Lixus brevirostris Boheman, 1836 c
 Lixus brevis Petri, 1928 c
 Lixus breweri Pascoe, 1874 c
 Lixus brunneus (Fabricius, J.C., 1781) c g
 Lixus buccinator Olivier, 1807 c
 Lixus buchanani Chittenden, 1930 i c
 Lixus caesareus Petri, 1914 c
 Lixus caffer Gyllenhal, 1836 c
 Lixus caffrarius Csiki, 1904 c
 Lixus calandroides Randall, 1838 c
 Lixus californicus Motschulsky, 1845 c
 Lixus caliginosus Fabricius, J.C., 1801 c
 Lixus callosus Boheman, 1845 c
 Lixus camerunus Petri, 1912 c
 Lixus canaliculatus Boheman, 1843 c
 Lixus candidus Olivier, 1807 c
 Lixus canescens Fischer de Waldheim, 1835 c g
 Lixus canus Wiedemann, 1823 c
 Lixus capiomonti Faust, 1883 c
 Lixus capitalis Petri, 1928 c
 Lixus capitatus Chittenden, 1930 c
 Lixus cardui Olivier, 1807 c
 Lixus carinatus Boheman, 1836 c
 Lixus carinellus Boheman, 1843 c
 Lixus carinerostris Boheman, 1843 c
 Lixus carinicollis Boheman, 1843 c
 Lixus cariniger Petri, 1912 c
 Lixus carlinae Olivier, 1807 c
 Lixus caroli Hartmann, 1906 c
 Lixus carthami Olivier, 1807 c
 Lixus castellanus Chevrolat, 1865 c
 Lixus catati Hustache, 1920 c
 Lixus caucasicus Petri, 1904 c
 Lixus caudatus Champion, 1902 c
 Lixus caudifer LeConte, 1876 i c
 Lixus caudiger Petri, 1928 c
 Lixus causticus Faust, 1886 c
 Lixus cavatus Petri, 1928 c
 Lixus cavicollis Blatchley, 1922 c
 Lixus cavipennis Petri, 1928 c
 Lixus cenobita Olivier, 1807 c
 Lixus centaureae Olivier, 1807 c
 Lixus centaurii Olivier, 1807 c
 Lixus chawneri Wollaston, 1854 c
 Lixus cheiranthi Wollaston, 1854 c
 Lixus chevrolati Boheman, 1843 c
 Lixus christophi Faust, 1892 c
 Lixus chulliati Hustache, 1920 c
 Lixus cinerascens Boheman, 1836 c g
 Lixus cinereus Latreille, 1804 c
 Lixus cinnabarinus Waltl, 1839 c
 Lixus circumcinctus Boheman, 1836 c
 Lixus circumdatus Schoenherr, 1835 c
 Lixus circumscriptus Petri, 1912 c
 Lixus clathratus Schoenherr, 1826 c
 Lixus clatratus Olivier, 1807 c
 Lixus clavipes Fabricius, J.C., 1801 c
 Lixus cleoniformis Petri, 1904 c
 Lixus cleonoides Chittenden, 1930 c
 Lixus coarctatus Klug, 1834 c
 Lixus coarcticollis Boheman, 1843 c
 Lixus coenobita Olivier, 1807 c
 Lixus colchicus Petri, 1904 c
 Lixus collaris Petri, 1928 c
 Lixus collarti Hustache, 1934 c
 Lixus coloradensis Chittenden, 1930 c
 Lixus coloratus Petri, 1904 c
 Lixus columbianus Petri, 1928 c
 Lixus comparabilis Kolbe, 1898 c
 Lixus compressicollis J. Thomson, 1858 c
 Lixus concavus Say, 1831 i c b  (rhubarb weevil)
 Lixus confinis Billberg, 1820 c
 Lixus conformatus Csiki, 1934 c
 Lixus conformis Dejean, 1830 c
 Lixus confusus Desbrochers, 1904 c
 Lixus conicirostris Olivier, 1807 c
 Lixus conicollis Boheman, 1835 c
 Lixus conicus Sturm, 1826 c
 Lixus coniformis Csiki, 1934 c
 Lixus connivens Gyllenhal, 1836 c
 Lixus consenescens Boheman, 1835 c
 Lixus constrictus Boheman, 1835 c
 Lixus contractus Gemminger, 1871 c g
 Lixus convexicollis Petri, 1904 c
 Lixus copiosus Lea, 1899 c
 Lixus coriaceus Klug, c
 Lixus corpulentus Petri, 1912 c
 Lixus costalis Boheman, 1835 c
 Lixus costatus Germar, 1824 c
 Lixus costipennis Petri, 1912 c
 Lixus costirostris Seidlitz, 1891 c
 Lixus costulatus Kolbe, 1898 c
 Lixus cottyi Desbrochers, 1904 c
 Lixus coutieri Hustache, 1920 c
 Lixus crassipes Megerle, c
 Lixus crassipunctatus Chittenden, 1930 c
 Lixus crassulus Notman, 1920 c
 Lixus cretaceus Chevrolat, 1866 c
 Lixus creteopictus Wollaston, 1867 c
 Lixus cribricollis Boheman, 1836 c
 Lixus criniger Illiger, c
 Lixus crinipes Quedenfeldt, 1888 c
 Lixus cruciferae Hoffmann, 1956 c
 Lixus crux Petri, 1928 c
 Lixus cuneiformis Fåhraeus, 1871 c
 Lixus cuniculinus Olivier, 1807 c
 Lixus cuniculus Olivier, 1807 c
 Lixus curtipennis Hustache, 1923 c
 Lixus curtirostris Tournier, 1878 c
 Lixus curtulus Petri, 1928 c
 Lixus curvinasus Kolbe, 1898 c
 Lixus curvirostris Capiomont, 1874 c
 Lixus cylindraceus Boheman, 1836 c
 Lixus cylindricus Fabricius, J.C., 1801 c
 Lixus cylindroides Schoenherr, 1836 c
 Lixus cylindrus Gültekin, 2010 c
 Lixus cynarae Latreille, 1804 c
 Lixus cynarophilus Capiomont, 1874 c
 Lixus davidiani Gultekin & Korotyaev, 2012 c
 Lixus deceptus Blatchley & Leng, 1916 c
 Lixus declivis Olivier, 1807 c
 Lixus decorsei Hustache, 1920 c
 Lixus defloratus Olivier, 1807 c
 Lixus delatus Kuschel, 1950 c
 Lixus denticollis Petri, 1904 c
 Lixus dentipes Dejean, 1821 c
 Lixus denudatus Zubkov, 1833 c
 Lixus depressipennis Roelofs, 1873 c
 Lixus depressirostris Petri, 1914 c
 Lixus depressus Boheman, 1843 c
 Lixus deremius Kolbe, 1898 c
 Lixus desbrochersi Hoffmann, 1957 c
 Lixus descarpentriesi Hustache, 1920 c
 Lixus deserticola Hoffmann, 1957 c
 Lixus desertorum Gebler, 1830 c
 Lixus devillei Hoffmann, 1955 c
 Lixus difficilis Capiomont, 1874 c
 Lixus diloris Germar, 1819 c
 Lixus discedens Petri, 1912 c
 Lixus discolor Boheman, 1836 c
 Lixus discrepans Petri, 1928 c
 Lixus discretus Petri, 1928 c
 Lixus dissimilis Chittenden, 1930 c
 Lixus distinctus Germar, 1824 c
 Lixus distinguendus Desbrochers, 1893 c
 Lixus distortus Csiki, 1934 c
 Lixus diutinus Faust, 1883 c
 Lixus divaricatus Motschulsky, 1860 c
 Lixus dogoanus Hoffmann, 1954 c
 Lixus dohrni Faust, 1889 c
 Lixus dolus Faust, 1883 c
 Lixus dorsalis Dejean, 1837 c
 Lixus dorsotinctus Fairmaire, 1904 c
 Lixus dregei Boheman, 1843 c
 Lixus dubiosus Petri, 1928 c
 Lixus dubitabilis Fairmaire, 1875 c
 Lixus dubius Fabricius, J.C., 1801 c
 Lixus duplicatus Fremuth, 1983 c
 Lixus duponti Schoenherr, 1843 c
 Lixus elegans Petri, 1928 c
 Lixus elegantulus Boheman, 1843 c
 Lixus elendeensis Hustache, 1936 c
 Lixus elephantulus Chittenden, 1930 c
 Lixus elongatulus Petri, 1928 c
 Lixus elongatus Germar, 1824 c
 Lixus emarginatus Latreille, 1804 c
 Lixus emeljanovi Ter-Minasian, 1973 c
 Lixus encaustes Faust, 1890 c
 Lixus eschscholtzi Boheman, 1836 c
 Lixus eschscholtzii Boheman, 1835 c
 Lixus eucylindrus Kolbe, 1898 c
 Lixus euphorbiae Capiomont, 1874 c
 Lixus evanescens Petri, 1928 c
 Lixus eversmanni Hochhuth, 1847 c
 Lixus ewaldi Alziar, 1978 c
 Lixus exaratus Klug, 1850 c
 Lixus excavaticollis Boheman, 1843 c
 Lixus excelsus Faust, 1891 c
 Lixus excoriatus Illiger, c
 Lixus eximius Casey, 1891 c
 Lixus eylandti Petri, 1904 c
 Lixus fahraei Csiki, 1904 c
 Lixus fairmairei Faust, 1890 c
 Lixus fallax Boheman, 1843 c
 Lixus farinifer Reitter, 1892 c
 Lixus fariniferus Desbrochers, 1898 c
 Lixus farinosulus Csiki, 1934 c
 Lixus farinosus Boisduval, 1835 c
 Lixus fasciatus Redtenbacher, 1844 c
 Lixus fasciculatus Boheman, 1836 c
 Lixus fascifarius Reitter, 1895 g
 Lixus fastigatus Petri, 1912 c
 Lixus faunus Olivier, 1807 c
 Lixus fausti Petri, 1904 c
 Lixus favens Boheman, 1835 c
 Lixus fecundus Faust, 1892 c
 Lixus ferrugatus Fabricius, J.C., 1801 c
 Lixus ferrugineus Sturm, 1826 c
 Lixus ferulae Ter-Minasian, 1985 c
 Lixus ferulaginis Apfelbeck, 1899 c
 Lixus figuratus Fåhraeus, 1871 c
 Lixus filiformis (Fabricius, J.C., 1781) c g
 Lixus filum Faust, 1884 c
 Lixus fimbriolatus Boheman, 1835 c
 Lixus fissirostris Petri, 1912 c
 Lixus flaveolus Motschulsky, 1849 c
 Lixus flavescens Boheman, 1836 c
 Lixus flavicornis Boheman, 1843 c
 Lixus flavipunctatus Zumpt, 1936 c
 Lixus flexipennis Chittenden, 1930 i c
 Lixus floccosus Fairmaire, 1904 c
 Lixus formaneki Reitter, 1895 c
 Lixus formosus Petri, 1928 c
 Lixus fossus LeConte, 1876 i c
 Lixus foveatostriatus Csiki, 1934 c
 Lixus foveinotus Petri, 1928 c
 Lixus foveiventris Desbrochers, 1904 c
 Lixus foveolaticollis Ter-Minasian, 1972 c
 Lixus foveolatus Boheman, 1836 c
 Lixus frater Faust, 1895 c
 Lixus fraternus Petri, 1912 c
 Lixus fumidus Boheman, 1843 c
 Lixus furcatus Olivier, 1807 c
 Lixus gages Fabricius, J.C., 1801 c
 Lixus gandoensis Hustache, 1939 c
 Lixus gazella Fabricius, J.C., 1801 c
 Lixus gemellatus Gyllenhal, 1836 c
 Lixus gemellus Petri, 1928 c
 Lixus geminatus Boheman, 1843 c
 Lixus gemmellatus Gyllenhal, 1836 c
 Lixus germaini Hustache, 1936 c
 Lixus germari Boheman, 1843 c
 Lixus gerstaeckeri Petri, 1912 c
 Lixus ghesquierei Hustache, 1937 c
 Lixus gibbirostris Petri, 1904 c
 Lixus gibbosus Petri, 1928 c
 Lixus gibbus Cristofori & Jan, 1832 c
 Lixus giganteus Leoni, 1907 c
 Lixus gigas Fairmaire, 1904 c
 Lixus glaucus Latreille, 1804 c
 Lixus globicollis Petri, 1905 c
 Lixus gracilicornis Capiomont, 1874 c
 Lixus gracilis Dejean, 1821 c
 Lixus grammicus Latreille, 1804 c
 Lixus granicollis Aurivillius, 1910 c
 Lixus granulatus Olivier, 1807 c
 Lixus granulicollis Aurivillius, 1910 c
 Lixus gravidus Olivier, 1807 c
 Lixus griseosparsus Voss, 1965 c
 Lixus gurjevae Ter-Minasian, 1968 c
 Lixus guttatus Olivier, 1807 c
 Lixus guttiventris Boheman, 1843 c
 Lixus guttula Olivier, A.G., 1807 c
 Lixus guttulatus Desbrochers, 1899 c
 Lixus habilis Hustache, 1937 c
 Lixus haematocerus Germar, 1817 c
 Lixus haerens Boheman, 1836 c
 Lixus hartmanni Petri, 1912 c
 Lixus hastatus Petri, 1928 c
 Lixus hauseri Voss, 1932 c
 Lixus hebetatus Hustache, 1937 c
 Lixus helenae Hustache, 1923 c
 Lixus helvolus Boheman, 1843 c
 Lixus heydeni Faust, 1891 c
 Lixus hieroglyphicus Olivier, 1807 c
 Lixus hieroglyphus Olivier, 1807 c
 Lixus hildebrandti Harold, 1879 c
 Lixus hirticaudis Germar, 1824 c
 Lixus hirticollis Ménétriés, 1849 c
 Lixus hispaniolus Petri, 1928 c
 Lixus hissaricus Ter-Minasian, 1966 c
 Lixus hottentottus Boheman, 1843 c
 Lixus hottentotus Boheman, 1843 c
 Lixus hovanus Hustache, 1920 c
 Lixus humbloti Hustache, 1920 c
 Lixus humerosus Fairmaire, 1904 c
 Lixus humilis Petri, 1914 c
 Lixus hungarus Petri, 1905 c
 Lixus hybridus Petri, 1928 c
 Lixus hypocrita Chevrolat, 1866 c
 Lixus ibis Petri, 1904 c
 Lixus ignavus J.Thomson, 1858 c
 Lixus illaudatus Hustache, 1937 c
 Lixus imitator Faust, 1892 c
 Lixus imitatus Hustache, 1937 c
 Lixus immundus Boheman, 1859 c
 Lixus impar Desbrochers, 1899 c
 Lixus impexus Voss, 1960 c
 Lixus imponderosus Lea, 1911 c
 Lixus impressicollis Klug, J.C.F., 1829 c g
 Lixus impressifrons Petri, 1904 c g
 Lixus impressiventris Petri, 1905 c
 Lixus impressus Sahlberg, 1823 c
 Lixus inaffectatus Hustache, 1936 c
 Lixus incanescens Boheman, 1836 c
 Lixus incarnatus Gyllenhal, 1836 c
 Lixus incurvinasus Csiki, 1934 c
 Lixus inermipennis Desbrochers, 1904 c
 Lixus inermipes Petri, 1928 c
 Lixus inermis Champion, 1902 c
 Lixus inflexofemoratus Petri, 1928 c
 Lixus infrequens Hoffmann, 1954 c
 Lixus inhumeralis Hustache, 1938 c
 Lixus inops Schoenherr, 1832 c
 Lixus inquinatus Boheman, 1835 c
 Lixus insolens Faust, 1899 c
 Lixus insularis Capiomont, 1874 c
 Lixus intermedius Petri, 1912 c
 Lixus invarius Walker, 1871 c
 Lixus iridis Olivier, 1807 c g
 Lixus irkutensis Faust, 1894 c
 Lixus irresectus Boheman, 1836 c
 Lixus irroratus Boheman, 1835 c
 Lixus isfahanensis Gültekin, 2010 c
 Lixus isselii Gestro, 1889 c
 Lixus itimbirensis Duvivier, 1892 c
 Lixus ivae Chittenden, 1930 c
 Lixus jaceae Latreille, 1804 c
 Lixus javanus Faust, 1896 c
 Lixus jekeli Desbrochers, 1891 c
 Lixus jucundus Faust, 1892 c
 Lixus julichi Casey, 1891 i c
 Lixus julliani Hustache, 1923 c
 Lixus junci Boheman, c
 Lixus juncii Boheman, 1835 c
 Lixus kabulensis Voss, 1961 c
 Lixus karakumicus Bajtenov & Soyunov, 1990 c
 Lixus karelini Boheman, 1835 c
 Lixus kasaiensis Hustache, 1934 c
 Lixus kazakhstanicus Ter-Minasian, 1970 c
 Lixus kenyae Hustache, 1929 c
 Lixus kilimanus Kolbe, 1898 c
 Lixus kiritshenkoi Ter-Minasian, 1985 c
 Lixus kolbei Faust, 1899 c
 Lixus kolenati Hochhuth, 1847 c
 Lixus kolenatii Hochhuth, 1847 c
 Lixus korbi Petri, 1904 c
 Lixus korotyaevi Ter-Minasian, 1989 c
 Lixus kraatzii Capiomont, 1874 c
 Lixus kuatunensis Voss, 1958 c
 Lixus kulzeri Zumpt, 1932 c
 Lixus lacunosus Petri, 1928 c
 Lixus laesicollis LeConte, 1858 c
 Lixus laevicollis Petri, 1912 c
 Lixus languidus Faust, 1891 c
 Lixus laramiensis Casey, 1891 i c
 Lixus larinoides Petri, 1914 c
 Lixus lateralis Say, 1831 i c
 Lixus lateripictus Fairmaire, 1879 c
 Lixus laticollis Petri, 1905 c
 Lixus latirostris Latreille, 1804 c
 Lixus latro Marshall, 1945 c
 Lixus laufferi Petri, 1905 c
 Lixus lautus Voss, 1958 c
 Lixus lecontei Faust, 1883 c
 Lixus lefebvrei Boheman, 1835 c
 Lixus leleupi Marshall, 1953 c
 Lixus leninus Hustache, 1936 c
 Lixus lentzi Hustache, 1924 c
 Lixus lepidii Motschulsky, 1860 c
 Lixus leptosomus Blatchley, 1914 c
 Lixus levantinus Petri, 1904 c
 †Lixus ligniticus Piton, 1940 c
 Lixus likimiensis Hustache, 1937 c
 Lixus limbatus Sturm, 1826 c
 Lixus limbifer Petri, 1928 c
 Lixus lindiensis Hustache, 1938 c
 Lixus linearis Olivier, 1807 c
 Lixus lineatus Sturm, 1826 c
 Lixus lineola Fabricius, J.C., 1801 c
 Lixus linnei Faust, 1888 c
 Lixus lividus (Yeats, T.P., 1776) c g
 Lixus lodingi Chittenden, 1930 c
 Lixus longicollis Kolbe, 1898 c
 Lixus longipennis Hustache, 1939 c
 Lixus longulus Klug, J.C.F., 1829 c g
 Lixus loratus Germar, 1824 c
 Lixus loricatus Schneider, c
 Lixus luculentus Casey, 1891 c
 Lixus lugens Petri, 1912 c
 Lixus lukjanovitshi Ter-Minasian, 1966 c
 Lixus lupinus Blatchley, 1914 c
 Lixus lusingaensis Voss, 1962 c
 Lixus lutescens Capiomont, 1874 c
 Lixus luzonicus Faust, 1895 c
 Lixus lycophoeus Boheman, 1835 c
 Lixus lycophorus Boheman, 1836 c
 Lixus lymexylon Fabricius, J.C., 1801 c
 Lixus macer LeConte, 1876 i c b
 Lixus macilentus Olivier, 1807 c
 Lixus maculatus Roelofs, 1873 c
 Lixus maculipennis Champion, 1902 c
 Lixus madagassus Faust, 1889 c
 Lixus madaranus Kono, 1929 c
 Lixus madidus Olivier, 1807 c
 Lixus maicopicus Ter-Minasian, 1966 c
 Lixus malatianus Faust, 1890 c
 Lixus malignus Faust, 1894 c
 Lixus manifestus Kirsch, 1868 c
 Lixus margaritae Davidyan in Korotyaev, Ismailova, Arzanov, Davidyan & Prasolov, 1993 c
 Lixus marginalis Curtis, 1837 c
 Lixus marginatus Say, 1831 i c b
 Lixus marginemaculatus Bach, 1854 c
 Lixus maritimus Fall, 1913 i c
 Lixus marmoratus Latreille, 1804 c
 Lixus marqueti Desbrochers, 1870 c
 Lixus massaicus Kolbe, 1898 c
 Lixus mastersi Pascoe, 1874 c
 Lixus maurus Olivier, 1807 c
 Lixus melanocephalus Fabricius, J.C., 1801 c
 Lixus meles Boheman, 1836 c
 Lixus mephitis Chittenden, 1930 c
 Lixus meregallii Fremuth, 1983 c
 Lixus merula Suffrian, 1871 i c b
 Lixus mesopotamicus Olivier, 1807 c
 Lixus mexicanus Boheman, 1843 c
 Lixus miagri Laporte, 1840 c
 Lixus microlepis Ter-Minasian, 1973 c
 Lixus mimicanus Marshall, 1915 c
 Lixus miniatocinctus Desbrochers, 1866 c
 Lixus minutus Escalera, 1914 c
 Lixus mixtus Leconte, 1876 c
 Lixus mocquerysi Hustache, 1920 c
 Lixus modestus Mannerheim, 1843 c
 Lixus mogadorus Heyden, 1887 c
 Lixus moivanus Kôno, 1928 c
 Lixus moiwanus Kôno, 1928 c
 Lixus montanus Aurivillius, 1926 c
 Lixus monticola Kirsch, 1878 c
 Lixus morbillosus Latreille, 1804 c
 Lixus morettiae Voss, 1964 c
 Lixus morosus Olivier, 1807 c
 Lixus morulus Blatchley & Leng, 1916 c
 Lixus motacilla Schoenherr, 1832 c
 Lixus mucidus LeConte, 1876 i c b
 Lixus mucoreus Pascoe, 1885 c
 Lixus mucronatus Fabricius, J.C., 1801 c g
 Lixus muongus Heller, 1922 c
 Lixus musculus Say, 1831 i c b
 Lixus mutabiis Petri, 1928 c
 Lixus mutabilis Petri, 1928 c
 Lixus myagri Olivier, 1807 c
 Lixus nanus Boheman, 1836 c
 Lixus nathaliae Hustache, 1956 c
 Lixus nebulifasciatus Walker, 1859 c
 Lixus nebulosus Latreille, 1804 c
 Lixus neglectus Cristofori & Jan, 1832 c
 Lixus niansanus Kolbe, 1898 c
 Lixus nigricornis Desbrochers, 1893 c
 Lixus nigrinus Champion, 1902 c
 Lixus nigripes Hustache, 1933 c
 Lixus nigritarsis Boheman, 1835 c
 Lixus nigrolineatus Voss, 1967 c
 Lixus niloticus Chevrolat, 1873 c
 Lixus nitidirostris Kolbe, 1898 c
 Lixus nitidulus Casey, 1891 i c b
 Lixus noctuinus Petri, 1904 c
 Lixus nordmanni Hochhuth, 1847 c
 Lixus notatus Fabricius, J.C., 1801 c
 Lixus novellus Blatchley, 1925 c
 Lixus nubeculosus Illiger, c
 Lixus nubianus Capiomont, 1875 c
 Lixus nubilosus Boheman, 1835 c
 Lixus nycterophorus Reiche, 1850 c
 Lixus obesulus Casey, 1891 i c
 Lixus obesus Petri, 1904 c
 Lixus obliquenubilus Quedenfeldt, 1888 c
 Lixus obliquivittis Voss, 1937 c
 Lixus obliquus Olivier, 1807 c
 Lixus oblongus Petri, 1905 c
 Lixus obovatus Hustache, 1933 c
 Lixus obsoletus Endrödi, 1959 c
 Lixus ocellatus Chittenden, 1930 c
 Lixus ochraceus Boheman, 1843 c
 Lixus octolineatus (Olivier, A.G., 1791) c g
 Lixus ocularis Germar, 1819 c
 Lixus odontalgicus Olivier, 1807 c
 Lixus olivieri Faust, 1891 c
 Lixus onopordi Olivier, 1807 c
 Lixus opacirostris Hustache, 1939 c
 Lixus opacus Petri, 1912 c
 Lixus operculifer Petri, 1904 c
 Lixus ophthalmicus Latreille, 1804 c
 Lixus orbitalis Boheman, 1835 c
 Lixus ordinatipennis Chittenden, 1930 c
 Lixus oregonus Casey, 1891 i c
 Lixus orientalis Dejean, 1821 c
 Lixus overlaeti Hustache, 1934 c
 Lixus pacificus Olivier, 1807 c
 Lixus pallasi Faust, 1890 c
 Lixus pallens Boheman, 1843 c
 Lixus pallipes Zumpt, 1938 c
 Lixus palmatus Olivier, 1807 c
 Lixus palpebratus Boheman, 1836 c
 Lixus palumbus Olivier, 1807 c
 Lixus papei Petri, 1912 c
 Lixus papillifer Petri, 1912 c
 Lixus paradoxus Kolbe, 1898 c
 Lixus paraguayanus Petri, 1928 c
 Lixus parallelus Dejean, 1830 c
 Lixus paraplecticus (Linnaeus, C., 1758) c g
 Lixus parcus LeConte, 1876 i c b  (knotweed weevil)
 Lixus pardalis Boheman, 1836 c
 Lixus parilis Faust, 1899 c
 Lixus parummaculatus Voss, 1962 c
 Lixus paulmeyeri Petri, 1905 c
 Lixus paulonotatus Pic, 1904 c
 Lixus pedronii Talamelli, 2008 c
 Lixus peninsularis Fall, 1913 c
 Lixus peraffinis Hustache, 1939 c
 Lixus peregrinus Boheman, 1836 c
 Lixus perforatus LeConte, 1876 i c b
 Lixus peristriatus Chittenden, 1930 c
 Lixus perjurus Hustache, 1936 c
 Lixus perlongus Fall, 1913 i c
 Lixus perparvulus Desbrochers, 1870 c
 Lixus perplexus Faust, 1888 c
 Lixus perrieri Hustache, 1920 c
 Lixus peruvianus Petri, 1928 c
 Lixus pervestitus Chittenden, 1930 i c b
 Lixus petiolicola Gultekin & Korotyaev, 2011 c
 Lixus petrii Csiki, 1904 c
 Lixus pica Fabricius, J.C., 1801 c
 Lixus piceicornis Billberg, 1820 c
 Lixus pictipennis Hustache, 1934 c
 Lixus pierrei Roudier, 1954 c
 Lixus pilosellus Petri, 1928 c
 Lixus pilosulus Faust, 1895 c
 Lixus pinguinasus Petri, 1912 c
 Lixus pinguirostris Petri, 1912 c
 Lixus pinguis Gerstaecker, 1871 c
 Lixus pinkeri Voss, 1965 g
 Lixus pisanus Schneider, c
 Lixus pistrinarius Boheman, 1835 c
 Lixus placidus LeConte, 1876 i c b
 Lixus plagiatus Fåhraeus, 1871 c
 Lixus planicollis Chittenden, 1930 c
 Lixus planifrons Petri, 1928 c
 Lixus plicatulus Petri, 1928 c
 Lixus plicatus Latreille, 1804 c
 Lixus plucheae Chittenden, 1930 c
 Lixus pollinosus Germar, 1819 c
 Lixus polylineatus Petri, 1904 c
 Lixus porcatus Boheman, 1843 c
 Lixus porculus Latreille, 1804 c
 Lixus poricollis Mannerheim, 1843 c
 Lixus posticus Faust, 1884 c
 Lixus pracuae Faust, 1891 c
 Lixus praepotens Boheman, 1836 c
 Lixus probus Faust, 1886 c
 Lixus productus Stephens, 1829 c
 Lixus professus Faust, 1883 c
 Lixus profundus Chittenden, 1930 c
 Lixus propinquus Petri, 1912 c
 Lixus pubirostris Petri, 1904 c
 Lixus pudens Fåhraeus, 1871 c
 Lixus pulcher Aurivillius, 1910 c
 Lixus pulverulentus Olivier, 1807 c g
 Lixus pulvinatus Boheman, 1836 c
 Lixus pulvisculosus Boheman, 1835 c
 Lixus punctatulus Petri, 1914 c
 Lixus punctatus Fischer de Waldheim, 1843 c
 Lixus puncticeps Hustache, 1939 c
 Lixus puncticollis Brisout, 1866 c
 Lixus punctinasus LeConte, 1876 i c b
 Lixus punctirostris Boheman, 1843 c
 Lixus punctiventris Germar, 1824 c
 Lixus punctulatus (Fabricius, J.C., 1787) c g
 Lixus pungoanus Harold, 1879 c
 Lixus purus Petri, 1914 c
 Lixus pusio Blatchley, 1928 c
 Lixus pygmaeus Casey, 1891 c
 Lixus pyrrhocnemis Boheman, 1843 c
 Lixus quadraticollis Desbrochers, 1904 c
 Lixus quadratipunctatus Chittenden, 1930 c
 Lixus quadricollis Champion, 1902 c
 Lixus quadrifoveatus Petri, 1928 c
 Lixus quadripustulatus Fabricius, J.C., 1801 c
 Lixus querulus Faust, 1899 c
 Lixus rasilis Faust, 1899 c
 Lixus ravicularis Sturm, 1826 c
 Lixus ravus Petri, 1928 c
 Lixus rectirostris Desbrochers, 1905 c
 Lixus rectodorsalis Petri, 1904 c
 Lixus rectus Leconte, 1876 c
 Lixus recurvatus Schoenherr, c
 Lixus recurvus Olivier, 1807 c
 Lixus redivivus Petri, 1914 c
 Lixus regularipennis Chittenden, 1930 c
 Lixus reichei Capiomont, 1874 c
 Lixus remaudierei Hoffmann, 1948 c
 Lixus reticulatus Fabricius, J.C., 1801 c
 Lixus reymondi Hoffmann, 1954 c
 Lixus rhombifer Petri, 1912 c
 Lixus rhomboidalis Boheman, 1843 c
 Lixus rhynchaenus Petri, 1912 c
 Lixus ritsemae Pascoe, 1883 c
 Lixus roccatii Camerano, 1907 c
 Lixus rojasi Jekel, 1860 c
 Lixus roreus Fabricius, J.C., 1801 c
 Lixus roridus Latreille, 1804 c
 Lixus rosenschoeldi Boheman, 1843 c
 Lixus rothschildi Aurivillius, 1912 c
 Lixus rubellus Randall, 1838 i c b
 Lixus rubicundus Dejean, 1821 c
 Lixus rubiginosus Dejean, 1821 c
 Lixus rubripennis Petri, 1914 c
 Lixus rubripes Desbrochers, 1905 c
 Lixus rubrolateralis Reitter, 1909 c
 Lixus rudiculus Petri, 1912 c
 Lixus rufescens Boheman, 1835 c
 Lixus ruficornis Boheman, 1836 c
 Lixus rufitarsis Boheman, 1835 c
 Lixus rufotibialis Csiki, 1934 c
 Lixus rufulus Boheman, 1835 c
 Lixus rugicollis Boheman, 1836 c
 Lixus rugifer Petri, 1905 c
 Lixus rugulicollis Petri, 1912 c
 Lixus rugulirostris Champion, 1902 c
 Lixus rumicis Hoffmann, 1956 c
 Lixus runzoriensis Marshall, 1909 c
 Lixus sabulosus Dejean, c
 Lixus sagax Faust, 1899 c
 Lixus saintpierrei Capiomont, 1874 c
 Lixus salentinus Costa, 1839 c
 Lixus salicorniae Faust, 1888 c
 Lixus salsolae Becker, 1867 c
 Lixus sandoaensis Hustache, 1934 c
 Lixus sanghaiensis Hustache, 1936 c
 Lixus sanguineus Schoenherr, 1835 c
 Lixus sardiniensis Boheman, 1843 c
 Lixus scabricollis Schneider, 1828 c
 Lixus scapularis Faust, 1887 c
 Lixus schach Faust, 1886 c
 Lixus schaeferi Hoffmann, 1950 c
 Lixus schoenherri Redtenbacher, 1867 c
 Lixus schouwiae Hoffmann, 1962 c
 Lixus scissifrons Petri, 1912 c
 Lixus scolopax Boheman, 1835 c g
 Lixus scolymi Olivier, 1807 c
 Lixus scoparii Dejean, 1821 c
 Lixus scrobicollis Boheman, 1836 i c b  (ragweed weevil)
 Lixus scrobirostris Capiomont, 1874 c
 Lixus sculptirostris Petri, 1914 c
 Lixus sculpturatus Petri, 1928 c
 Lixus scutellaris Petri, 1905 c
 Lixus scutulatus Petri, 1905 c
 Lixus secretus Faust, 1896 c
 Lixus sedentarius Hustache, 1934 c
 Lixus segnis Germar, 1824 c
 Lixus sejugatus Faust, 1889 c
 Lixus semilunatus Petri, 1904 c
 Lixus semipunctatus Fabricius, J.C., 1801 c
 Lixus semivittatus Casey, 1891 i c b
 Lixus seniculus Boheman, 1835 c
 Lixus senilis Latreille, 1804 c
 Lixus separabilis Petri, 1928 c
 Lixus separatus Petri, 1914 c
 Lixus sericatus Boheman, 1845 c
 Lixus seriemaculatus Petri, 1913 c
 Lixus seriesignatus Boheman, 1835 c
 Lixus serripes Desbrochers, 1898 c
 Lixus severini Faust, 1899 c
 Lixus sexualis Casey, 1891 c
 Lixus seydeli Hustache, 1934 c
 Lixus siamensis Desbrochers, 1898 c
 Lixus sibiricus Ballion, 1878 c
 Lixus sicanus Capiomont, 1874 c
 Lixus siculus Boheman, 1836 c
 Lixus simplex Boheman, 1843 c
 Lixus sinuatus Motschulsky, 1849 c
 Lixus sitta Sahlberg, 1823 c
 Lixus smirnoffi Hoffmann, 1962 c
 Lixus snae Merceron, ???? c
 Lixus sobrinus Casey, 1891 i c
 Lixus soror Casey, 1891 c
 Lixus spartii Olivier, 1807 c
 Lixus spartiiformis Hoffmann, 1956 c
 Lixus speciosus Miller, 1861 c
 Lixus spectabiilis Boheman, 1836 c
 Lixus spectabilis Boheman, 1835 c
 Lixus spinimanus Boheman, 1836 c
 Lixus spinipennis Petri, 1928 c
 Lixus staudingeri Petri, 1912 c
 Lixus strangulatus Faust, 1883 c
 Lixus striatellus Olivier, 1807 c
 Lixus striatopunctatus Desbrochers, 1904 c
 Lixus stupor Boheman, 1836 c
 Lixus sturmi Boheman, 1836 c
 Lixus sturmii Boheman, 1835 c
 Lixus subacutiformis Petri, 1928 c
 Lixus subacutus Boheman, 1843 c
 Lixus subangulatus Motschulsky, 1849 c
 Lixus subangustatus Motschulsky, 1849 c
 Lixus subcalvus Petri, 1928 c
 Lixus subcarinicollis Petri, 1928 c
 Lixus subcaudatus Boheman, 1843 c
 Lixus subconvexus Petri, 1912 c
 Lixus subcostatus Petri, 1912 c
 Lixus subcuneatus Faust, 1889 c
 Lixus subcuspidatus Voss, 1932 c
 Lixus subcylindricus Petri, 1908 c
 Lixus subdentatus Petri, 1904 c
 Lixus subfarinosus Desbrochers, 1893 c
 Lixus subfasciatus Cristofori & Jan, 1832 c
 Lixus sublimbellus Voss, 1962 c
 Lixus sublimis Petri, 1928 c
 Lixus sublinearis Petri, 1928 c
 Lixus sublobatus Petri, 1928 c
 Lixus subloratus Petri, 1928 c
 Lixus submaculatus Boheman, 1843 c
 Lixus submucronatus Petri, 1928 c
 Lixus subnebulosus Kolbe, 1883 c
 Lixus subornatus Hoffmann, 1962 c
 Lixus subpruinosus Petri, 1912 c
 Lixus subquadratithorax Desbrochers, 1895 c
 Lixus subrectinasus Desbrochers, 1899 c
 Lixus subsignatus Fåhraeus, 1871 c
 Lixus subtilis Sturm, 1826 c
 Lixus subulatus Faust, 1891 c
 Lixus subulipennis Boheman, 1835 c
 Lixus suetus Boheman, 1843 c
 Lixus suillus Illiger, c
 Lixus sulcaticollis Petri, 1928 c
 Lixus sulcatus Kirsch, 1868 c
 Lixus sulciger Kolbe, 1898 c
 Lixus sulcimargo Champion, 1902 c
 Lixus sulcinasus Faust, 1896 c
 Lixus sulcirostris Latreille, 1804 c
 Lixus sulphuratus Boheman, 1836 c
 Lixus sulphureovittis Brancsik, 1900 c
 Lixus sumatrensis Petri, 1912 c
 Lixus superciliosus Boheman, 1836 c
 Lixus sylvestris Marshall, 1941 c
 Lixus sylvius Boheman, 1843 c
 Lixus tabidus Latreille, 1804 c
 Lixus taeniatus Champion, 1902 c
 Lixus talamellii Colonnelli in Magnano, Colonneli & Caldara in van Harten (ed.), 2009 c
 Lixus talyshensis Ter-Minasian, 1966 c
 Lixus tanarivensis Hustache, 1920 c
 Lixus tardus Suffrian, 1871 c
 Lixus tasmanicus Germar, 1848 c
 Lixus tatariae Steven, 1829 c
 Lixus tauricus Petri, 1904 c
 Lixus temerarius Petri, 1928 c
 Lixus temporalis Hustache, 1939 c
 Lixus tenellus Casey, 1891 i c b
 Lixus tenuicollis Boheman, 1836 c
 Lixus tenuipes Hartmann, 1897 c
 Lixus tenuirostris Boheman, 1836 c
 Lixus teretiusculus Boheman, 1835 c
 Lixus terminalis LeConte, 1876 i c b
 Lixus terminatus Csiki, 1934 c
 Lixus tibialis Boheman, 1843 c
 Lixus tibiellus Desbrochers, 1904 c
 Lixus tigrinus Olivier, 1807 c
 Lixus titubans Faust, 1890 c
 Lixus toltecus Champion, 1902 c
 Lixus torvus Boheman, 1836 c
 Lixus transsylvanicus Tournier, c
 Lixus triangulifer Petri, 1912 c
 Lixus tricolor Sturm, 1826 c
 Lixus tricostalis Thunberg, 1815 c
 Lixus tricristatus Chittenden, 1930 c
 Lixus trilineatus Sturm, 1826 c
 Lixus trilobus Fabricius, J.C., 1801 c
 Lixus trinarius Petri, 1905 c
 Lixus tristis Boheman, 1836 c
 Lixus trivialis Fåhraeus, 1871 c
 Lixus trivittatus Capiomont, 1874 c
 Lixus truncatellus Schoenherr, 1826 c
 Lixus truncatulus Fabricius, J.C., 1801 c
 Lixus tschemkenticus Faust, 1883 c
 Lixus tubulatus Petri, 1928 c
 Lixus tunisiensis Desbrochers, 1893 c
 Lixus turanicus Reitter, 1888 c
 Lixus turbatus Dejean, 1821 c
 Lixus turkestanicus Desbrochers, 1898 c
 Lixus tusicollis Marshall, 1955 c
 Lixus ukamicus Faust, 1899 c
 Lixus ulcerosus Petri, 1904 c
 Lixus umbellatarum (Fabricius, J.C., 1787) c g
 Lixus uncticollis Petri, 1928 c
 Lixus uniformis Boheman, 1843 c
 Lixus ursus Latreille, 1804 c
 Lixus usambicus Kolbe, 1898 c
 Lixus vachshensis Ter-Minasian, 1966 c
 Lixus vacillatus Hustache, 1939 c
 Lixus validirostris Capiomont, 1874 c
 Lixus validus Harold, 1879 c
 Lixus varicolor Boheman, 1836 c
 Lixus vaulogeri Hustache, 1938 c
 Lixus vectiformis Wollaston, 1854 c
 Lixus ventralis Winkler, 1932 c
 Lixus ventriculus Petri, 1912 c
 Lixus venustulus Boheman, 1835 c
 Lixus vestitus Dejean, 1830 c
 Lixus vetula Matsumura, 1910 c
 Lixus vibex Schoenherr, 1835 c
 Lixus vicinus Dejean, 1830 c
 Lixus vilis (Rossi, P., 1790) c g
 Lixus villosulus Desbrochers, 1904 c
 Lixus virens Boheman, 1835 c
 Lixus vittatus Motschulsky, 1845 c
 Lixus vittiger Guerin-Meneville, 1833 c
 Lixus volvulus Fabricius, J.C., 1801 c
 Lixus vulneratus Schoenherr, 1835 c
 Lixus vulpes Olivier, 1807 c
 Lixus vulpinus Pascoe, 1885 c
 Lixus vultur Petri, 1912 c
 Lixus wahlbergi Boheman, 1845 c
 Lixus weisei Hartmann, 1904 c
 Lixus xambeui Hoffmann, 1955 c
 Lixus xanthocheloides Hustache, 1936 c
 Lixus xantusi Petri, 1904 c
 Lixus yunnanensis Voss, 1932 c
 Lixus zaitzevi Petri, 1906 c
 Lixus zoubkoffi Boheman, 1835 c
 Lixus zubkoffi Boheman, 1836 c

Data sources: i = ITIS, c = Catalogue of Life, g = GBIF, b = Bugguide.net

References

Lixus